Nicholas Mackie Hoerner (born May 13, 1997) is an American professional baseball second baseman and shortstop for the Chicago Cubs of Major League Baseball (MLB). He played college baseball at Stanford University, and was selected by the Cubs in the first round of the 2018 Major League Baseball draft. He made his MLB debut in 2019.

Amateur career
Hoerner attended Head-Royce School in Oakland, California, where he played soccer, basketball, and baseball. He played for the varsity baseball team all four years of high school and in 2015, as a senior, batted .517 with six home runs, 30 RBIs, and 40 runs scored. He was not drafted out of high school in the 2015 Major League Baseball draft. Hoerner then enrolled at Stanford University to play college baseball for the Stanford Cardinal.

In 2016, as a freshman, Hoerner started 53 of Stanford's 54 games at second base, batting .254 with 53 hits, 24 RBIs, and eight doubles. After the season, he played in the Northwoods League where he hit .304 with two home runs, 31 RBIs, 11 stolen bases, and 12 doubles in 257 at-bats. As a sophomore at Stanford in 2017, Hoerner switched positions, moving to shortstop. He started all 58 of Stanford's games that year and slashed .307/.357/.406 with 18 doubles, one home run, and 33 RBIs. Hoerner was named to the All-Pac-12 and All-Pac-12 Defensive teams. That summer, he played in the Cape Cod Baseball League with the Yarmouth-Dennis Red Sox where he batted .301 with six home runs, 30 RBIs, 16 stolen bases and eight doubles, and was named a league all-star. As a junior in 2018, Hoerner batted .345 with two home runs, 40 RBIs, and 15 stolen bases and was named to the All-Pac-12 team for the second straight year.

Professional career

Minor leagues
Hoerner was selected 24th overall by the Chicago Cubs in the 2018 Major League Baseball draft and signed for a $2.72 million signing bonus. He made his professional debut with the Arizona League Cubs was reassigned to the Eugene Emeralds in June, and was promoted to the South Bend Cubs in mid-July. However, he was placed on the disabled list on July 18 with a strained ligament in his left elbow, and was ruled out for the remainder of the regular season. In 14 games between the three teams prior to his injury, he hit .327 with two home runs, six RBIs, and six stolen bases. After the season, he was assigned to the Mesa Solar Sox of the Arizona Fall League.

Hoerner began 2019 with the Tennessee Smokies. He was placed on the injured list on April 27 after being hit on his left wrist, and returned to play in early July. Over seventy games with the Smokies, he slashed .284/.344/.399 with three home runs, 22 RBIs, and eight stolen bases.

Chicago Cubs
Chicago selected Hoerner's contract and promoted him to the major leagues on September 9, 2019, making him the first player from his draft class to make it to the majors. He made his major league debut that night versus the San Diego Padres. Hoerner got the start at shortstop and went 3-for-5 with four RBIs, including a single in his first at-bat against Cal Quantrill. Over twenty games for the Cubs, Hoerner batted .282 with three home runs and 17 RBIs. In a shortened 2020 season for the Cubs, Hoerner slashed .222/.312/.259 with 13 RBIs over 48 games.

Hoerner struggled with oblique injuries in 2021, and appeared in only 44 games for the Cubs. Over 149 at-bats, he slashed .302/.382/.369 with ten doubles, 16 RBIs, and five stolen bases.

During the Cubs' Opening Day game against the Milwaukee Brewers on April 7, 2022, Hoerner hit a two-run home run off of reigning NL Cy Young winner Corbin Burnes, the first home run of the 2022 MLB season and Hoerner's first since 2019. Hoerner had a much improved 2022 season, missing far fewer games and appearing in 135 games. He made 517 plate appearance while slashing .281/.327/.410 with 22 doubles, ten homers, and 55 RBIs. Hoerner played 133 of those games at shortstop and finished second in the National League in Outs Above Average.

After the Cubs signed free agent shortstop Dansby Swanson in December of 2022, it was anticipated that Hoerner would move to second base.

On January 13, 2023, Hoerner agreed to a one-year, $2.525 million contract with the Cubs, avoiding salary arbitration.

References

External links

Stanford Cardinal bio

1997 births
Living people
Baseball players from Oakland, California
Major League Baseball shortstops
Chicago Cubs players
Stanford Cardinal baseball players
Yarmouth–Dennis Red Sox players
Arizona League Cubs players
Eugene Emeralds players
South Bend Cubs players
Tennessee Smokies players
Mesa Solar Sox players
Iowa Cubs players
Madison Mallards players